Mattigaajulu is an Indian Telugu language soap opera aired on Gemini TV every Monday to Saturday from 1 July 2019 to 25 February 2023 for 1043 episodes. The serial stars Pragathi, Siddharth Varma, Ashwin in lead roles of season 1. The serial stars Ashvini, Inchara Joshi and Poorna Sai in lead roles of season 2.   

The first season focussed on Padmavathi and Seenayya's (Vishnu) love story and Padmavathi's fight for her identity. The first season stars Pragathi, Ashwin and Siddharth Varma as main protagonists and Varsha in pivotal role.

The second season focussed on the Padmavathi and Vishnu's Daughters Sakshi and Deeksha after being separated by circumstances and their triangle love story with Manohar.

Series overview

Plot
The story revolves around the girl named Padmavathi, who was raised in poverty who sells mud bangles despite being a legal heir to affluent family. Kamakshi is the main antagonist of the story, who is trying to clinch the wealth. She is trying to get property documents through bounded Malliswari, who is Padmavathi's mother. Malliswari is trying to escape from Kamakshi in search of her daughter. On the other hand, Kamakshi's son Vishnu is trying to love Padmavathi. Will Padmavathi able to realize her roots and meet her mother and How Vishnu and Padmavathi get United is main plot of the story.

Cast

Season 1
 Siddharth Varma (1 - 582)/Ashwin (583 - 823) as Vishnu aka Seenayya
 Pragathi as Padmavathi, Vishnu's wife and legal heir of property under Kamakshi
 Naveena Yata / Varsha as Kamakshi, Vishnu's mother,sakshi and deeksha's grand mother
 Sheela singh as Malliswari, Padmavathi's mother, deeksha's grand mother 
Shabeena as Mayuri
Nagireddy as Pushpa
Baby Varshini as Sakshi, Pavitra and vishnu's daughter
Baby Yukhta as Deeksha, Padmavathi and vishnu's daughter
Prem Sagar as Lavangam, Vishnu's Uncle
Nishanth as Chaitanya
Anshu Reddy as Pavithra,Vishnu 2nd wife,sakshi's mother,deeksha's  step-mother
Neelima / Shanthi Reddy as Bhuvaneshwari, Supriya and Nethra's mother
 Latha Sangaraju as Alivelu Manga
 Rajeev Kanakala as Manga's father
Madhu priya as Supriya
Chinni Krishna as Vishnu's father
Sri Priya / Sujatha Reddy as Meenakshi, Kamakshi's sister
Lakshmi Narayana as Meenakshi's husband
Avinash / Jayaprakash as chittibabu, Padmavathi's brother
Swetha shaini as Rangamma, Chittibabu's wife
Sathwik as Shankaram
Anusha as Honey, Vishnu's cousin
Kranthi as Bharath, Vishnu's cousin
Abhilasha as Nethra
Mahathi as Suvarna
Gowri Raj as Jwala
Baby Sahasra as chittibabu's daughter
Prabhakar as Dorababu, Kamakshi's brother
Prabhakar Podakandla as Harischandra Prasad
Durga Devi as Subhadra, Harischandra Prasad's wife
Kamuni Siva Kumar 

Raja Sridhar as Padmavathi's father (deceased) - cameo appearance

Season 2
Ashvini as Chitti (Deeksha), Padmavathi and vishnu's daughter 
Inchara Joshi as Radhika (Sakshi),Pavitra and vishnu's daughter.
Poorna Sai as Manohar
Yashwanth as Bobji
Durga Devi as Subhadra (Suresh, Ramesh's mother and Radhika's foster mother)
Chakravarthy as Gangayya, Chitti's foster father
Sri Lakshmi as Suguna, Chitti's foster mother
Keerthi Naidu as Durgamma, Bobji's mother
Dev as Suresh, Radhika's elder half brother
Priyanka as Surekha, Suresh's wife 
Imran Khan as Ramesh, Radhika's younger half brother
Marakala Srinu as Balaraju, Bobji's friend
Naveena as Hostel warden
Prem Sagar as Lavangam, Sakshi and Deeksha's grand father
Sandhya Peddada as Dr Sumalatha

References

External links
 

Indian television soap operas
Telugu-language television shows
2019 Indian television series debuts
Gemini TV original programming